Zambo is a racial term used to identify individuals of mixed African and Amerindian ancestry. Zambo or Zámbó may also refer to

Zambo (surname)
Arturo "Zambo" Cavero (1940–2009), an Afro-Peruvian singer
Zambo Department, a department in Ioba Province, Burkina Faso
Zambo, Ghana, a town in the Lawra District, Upper West Region, Ghana

See also
Sambo (disambiguation)